Elementor Ltd. is an Israeli software development company behind the Elementor  WordPress website platform. The Elementor website builder lets WordPress users  create and edit websites with a responsive drag-and-drop technique.

Elementor is offered in a freemium version and Elementor Pro.

Elementor Pro is an advanced web design tool that is suitable for more complex and feature-rich websites. While Elementor Free provides basic page builder functionality, Elementor Pro provides more extensive set of features and capabilities.

As of January 2021, Elementor was available in over 57 languages and ranks among the 5 highest-rated WordPress page builders with over 5 million active installations worldwide. It is an open-source, GPLv3 licensed platform and powers 2.24% of the top 1M websites in the world.

In its first round of institutional funding, the company raised $15 million from Lightspeed Venture Partners.

History
Elementor was founded in 2016 by Yoni Luksenberg and Ariel Klikstein.

Growth milestones:
1 million websites built with Elementor: July 5, 2018
2M websites built with Elementor: February 18, 2019
3M websites built with Elementor: August 14, 2019
4M websites built with Elementor: January 29, 2020
5M websites built with Elementor: May 12, 2020
8.7M websites built with Elementor: January 21, 2023

As of August 19, 2021, Elementor had published its free plugin version 3.4.2 and its paid Elementor Pro version 3.3.7.

In May 2019, the Elementor team officially got their "Hello" theme listed at WordPress.org. The Hello theme is a barebones theme framework specifically designed to pair with the Elementor page builder.

On March 31, 2020, Elementor launched an Experts Network for Web Creators.

Awards
Elementor was recognized by Israeli business daily Calcalist as one of the top 50 most promising Israeli startups for 2019.

Partnerships & acquisitions
In 2019, Elementor acquired Layers WP—a WordPress theme brand.  In the same year, Elementor partnered with A2 Hosting to provide a hosting account for its users.

Reception 
On WordPress.org, the Elementor plugin has a rating of 4.7 stars. ThemeIsle.com gave it a 9.3 rating, saying that it has many templates, different content modules, and was easy to use.

References

External links
 Official website

WordPress
Free web development software
Automated WYSIWYG editors
Online companies of Israel
Israeli brands